This is a list of operas by the Austrian-born (later American) composer Ernst Krenek (1900–1991).

References
Sources
 Purkis, Charlotte (1992b). "Krenek, Ernst". The New Grove Dictionary of Opera, ed. Stanley Sadie, 4 vols. London: Macmillan Press. 

 
Lists of operas by composer
Lists of compositions by composer